The 1967 Davis Cup was the 56th edition of the Davis Cup, the most important tournament between national teams in men's tennis. 32 teams entered the Europe Zone, 9 teams entered the Eastern Zone, and 7 teams entered the America Zone.

Ecuador defeated the United States in the Americas Inter-Zonal final, India defeated Japan in the Eastern Inter-Zonal final, and Spain and South Africa were the winners of the two Europe sub-zones, defeating the Soviet Union and Brazil respectively.

In the Inter-Zonal Zone, Spain defeated Ecuador and South Africa defeated India in the semifinals, and then Spain defeated South Africa in the final. Spain were then defeated by the defending champions Australia in the Challenge Round. The final was played at the Milton Courts in Brisbane, Australia on 26–28 December.

America Zone

North & Central America Zone

South America Zone

Americas Inter-Zonal Final
Ecuador vs. United States

Eastern Zone

Zone A

Zone B

Eastern Inter-Zonal Final
India vs. Japan

Europe Zone

Zone A

Zone A Final
Spain vs. Soviet Union

Zone B

Zone B Final
South Africa vs. Brazil

Inter-Zonal Zone

Draw

Semifinals
India vs. South Africa

Spain vs. Ecuador

Final
South Africa vs. Spain

Challenge Round
Australia vs. Spain

References

External links
Davis Cup Official Website

 
Davis Cups by year
Davis Cup
Davis Cup
Davis Cup
Davis Cup
Davis Cup
Davis Cup